Coiled-Coil Domain Containing protein 82 (CCDC82) is a protein that in humans, is encoded for by the gene of the same name, CCDC82. The CCDC82 gene is expressed in nearly all of human tissues at somewhat low rates. As of today, there are no patents involving CCDC82 and the function remains unknown.

Gene 

CCDC82 is located on chromosome 11 at 11q21.5. 
It contains two domains of unknown function, DUF4196 and DUF4211.  The DNA sequence is 37,155 base pairs long  and contains 7 exons.

Homology 

CCDC82 is present in many orthologs. It is conserved throughout other mammals, reptiles, birds and bony fish. It is not found in invertebrates, bacteria or fungi. There are no paralogs.

mRNA

Promoter 

The predicted promoter for CCDC82 is located on the minus strand and spans from base pairs 96,122,963 to 96,123,587. It is 625 base pairs long.

Transcription factors 

The transcription factors listed below are for the predicted promoter sequence and are located on the minus strand.

Protein 

The protein it encodes for is 344 amino acids in length. The protein itself is very acidic and is very rich in aspartic acid and glutamic acid. It is also very deficient in alanine, containing only two alanines in the entire sequence. The alanines are located adjacent to each other, amino acid number 233 and 234. Alanine 233 is highly conserved throughout the orthologs. The molecular weight is 40.0 kdal and the isoelectric point is 4.383

Expression 

CCDC82 is found in nearly all tissues in the human body, however it is present in higher quantities in the skeletal muscles, adrenal cortex, and the trigeminal ganglion.

Post translational modifications 

CCDC82 has several predicted phosphorylation sites.  There are 32 predicted serine phosphorylation sites, 5 threonine, and 3 tyrosine.

Interactions 

CCDC82 is known to interact with two proteins. It indirectly interacts with VHL, a gene that encodes for a tumor suppressor and ubiquitin protein ligase. It also interacts with EWSR1, which functions as a transcriptional repressor.

Clinical significance 

CCDC82 is a circulat-responsive gene. Circulat is a product designed to restore systemic vascular health. It is a plant based product and taken by patients who suffer from diabetes or circulatory problems.

Possible function 

Based on the information that CCDC82 is affected by the Circulat product it could be hypothesized that CCDC82 is involved in circulatory function. However, this is purely speculation.

References

External links